William McNeill may refer to:

 William H. McNeill (historian) (1917–2016), Canadian-born American historian
 William McNeill (politician) (fl. 1830s), Canadian politician
 William Simpson McNeill (1814–1902), Canadian politician
 William McNeill (philosopher) (born 1961), American professor of philosophy
 William Henry McNeill (1803–1875), American captain and discoverer of Victoria Harbour
 William McNeill Whistler (1836–1900), American Confederate soldier and surgeon
 Billy McNeill (1940–2019), Scottish football player and manager
 Billy McNeill (ice hockey) (1936–2007), Canadian ice hockey player

See also
 William J. MacNeil, politician in Newfoundland